Arrhyton dolichura, the Havana racerlet or Habana Island racer , is a species of snake in the family Colubridae. It is found in Cuba.

References 

Arrhyton
Reptiles described in 1909
Reptiles of Cuba
Taxa named by Franz Werner